Transit of Venus is the fourth studio album by Canadian rock band Three Days Grace. It was released on October 2, 2012 through RCA Records. The album is the band's first to be released under the record label, following the folding of their former label, Jive Records, in 2011. The album was produced by Don Gilmore and recorded at Revolution Studios in Toronto.

On June 5, 2012, the same day as Venus' visible transit across the sun, the band released the album title and release date. The album spawned three singles ("Chalk Outline", "The High Road" and "Misery Loves My Company"). It is the band's last album to feature lead singer Adam Gontier, who departed the band on January 9, 2013.

The album debuted at No. 5 on the Billboard 200. It was nominated for Best Rock Album at the Juno Awards of 2014.

Background and recording
"We went for a tighter, more articulated sound on this record", said Neil Sanderson, the drummer of the band. "The music we were writing was a little more intricate than in the past, and we've been experimenting with new instruments. We wanted to present these new ideas concisely without going over-the-top in ambience and overall production." On August 1, 2012, the band announced that they had finished the recording process of the album, saying in a Facebook post: "Going out on a limb here but I think this record....is actually....finished....wow...what a great journey....thanks to Don Gilmore." The album was made available to stream online on September 27, 2012. The band co-headlined a US arena tour with Shinedown that began in early 2013.

"Chalk Outline" is the first single of the album and was released on August 14, 2012. It was released with a lyric video. Loudwire gave the song a 4/5 rating, saying that "Adam Gontier attacks the track with as much angst and aggression as ever." Eviqshed.com gave the single 5/5, praising the fact the band took a different direction musically. The lyric video to the song was published on YouTube on Three Days Grace's Vevo account on August 13 and the official music video was published on October 5.

Reception

Critical reception

Upon its release, the album was met with generally favorable reviews by mainstream music critics, citing the band's different musical direction. Loudwire gave the album a 4 out of 5, saying that "Three Days Grace has stepped out of their comfort zone, ditched the formula, and went all in, holding nothing back in the true spirit of rock." Another positive review came from Artistdirect's Rick Florino, who said that "Three Days Grace have undeniably progressed here, and the results are nothing short of incredible." Johan Wippsson of Melodic wrote that in Transit of Venus "there's an aggressive undertone, which sets a perfect alternative touch on the album."
 
Gregory Heaney at AllMusic describes the album as "more refined than anything they've done before". Heaner adds that the "level of atmosphere" on the album allows Three Days Grace to stand out among other post-grunge bands. An article by music journalist Clayton Petras in Inspirer Magazine gave the album a positive review, mentioning that although the album "opens with some eerie notes and a crooning Adam Gontier that we're not quite used to", it goes on to mention that the album settles into "the gruff, rugged sound we've come to expect from the band".On YouTube, most fans consider it the best album of Three Days Grace.

Chart performance
The album debuted at No. 5 on the Billboard 200, selling 48,000 copies in the U.S. in its first week, two positions behind the band's previous album Life Starts Now, but the same position as One-X. Transit of Venus also featured at No. 1 on U.S. Billboard Top Hard Rock Albums, No. 3 on both the U.S. Billboard Top Rock Albums and U.S. Billboard Top Alternative Albums, and at No. 4 on both U.S. Billboard Top Digital Albums and on the Canadian Albums Chart. On Loudwire, the song "Chalk Outline" won the website's Rock Song of the Year award for 2012. The song topped the U.S. Billboard Mainstream Rock Tracks charts debuting at No. 1 and remaining in this position for 13 consecutive weeks, before dropping to No. 3 on its seventeenth week on the chart. The song also reached No. 1 on the Active Rock Radio chart, and remained in this position for eleven weeks. This makes "Chalk Outline" the ninth Three Days Grace song to top Active Rock Radio. "Chalk Outline" also peaked at No. 6 on the U.S. Billboard Bubbling Under Hot 100 Singles, 
No. 7 on the U.S. Billboard Rock Songs, No. 15 on the U.S. Billboard Alternative Songs Chart, and No. 65 on the Canadian Hot 100. The album has sold 258,000 copies in the U.S. as of March 2015.

Track listing

Personnel
Credits via AllMusic:

Three Days Grace
 Adam Gontier – lead vocals, rhythm guitar
 Barry Stock – lead guitar
 Brad Walst – bass guitar
 Neil Sanderson – drums, percussion, keyboards, programming, backing vocals

Production
 Don Gilmore – producer
 David Wolter – A&R
 Mark Kiczula – engineer 
 Keith Armstrong – assistant mixing engineer
 Jason Dufour – assistant engineer
 Nik Karpen – assistant mixing engineer
 Stephen Koszler – assistant engineer
 Andrew Schubert – additional assistant mixing engineer
 Brad Townsend – additional assistant mixing engineer
 Brad Blackwood – mastering
 Chris Lord-Alge – mixing

Artwork
 Joseph Episcopo – stylist
 Chris Feldman – art direction
 Three Days Grace – art direction
 Michael Muller – photography
 Walter Nomura – illustrations

Charts

Weekly charts

Year-end charts

Certifications

References

2012 albums
Three Days Grace albums
RCA Records albums
Transit of Venus